The 1974–75 English football season was Aston Villa's 75th season in the Football League, this season playing in the Football League Second Division. Villa qualified for Europe for the first time by winning the League Cup.

Ron Saunders was appointed manager in June 1974, replacing Vic Crowe who had been sacked in April. Saunders guided Aston Villa to League Cup success against Norwich in the only final of the competition between two Second Division teams. Both clubs were also promoted to the First Division.

Second Division

Results

Second Division

League Cup

FA Cup

References

External links
AVFC History: 1974–75 season

Aston Villa F.C. seasons
Aston Villa F.C. season